The 2006–07 All-Ireland Junior Club Hurling Championship was the fourth staging of the All-Ireland Junior Club Hurling Championship since its establishment by the Gaelic Athletic Association.

The All-Ireland final was played on 11 March 2007 at Croke Park in Dublin, between Danesfort from Kilkenny and Clooney Gaels from Antrim, in what was their first ever meeting in the final. Danesfort won the match by 2-16 to 2-08 to claim their first ever All-Ireland title.

Munster Junior Club Hurling Championship

Munster quarter-final

Munster semi-finals

Munster final

All-Ireland Junior Club Hurling Championship

All-Ireland quarter-final

All-Ireland semi-finals

All-Ireland final

Championship statistics

Miscellaneous

 Skehana became the first team to win consecutive Connacht Championship titles.

References

All-Ireland Junior Club Hurling Championship
All-Ireland Junior Club Hurling Championship
All-Ireland Junior Club Hurling Championship